Belchhi is a historically important village in Bihar state, India.

Indira Gandhi visit

In 1977, Indira Gandhi was out of power. It was then that she visited Belchhi to meet with surviving victims of atrocities perpetrated there against untouchables. She gone to belchhi by riding elephant, she inspired a new public image. This event triggered a reversal of fortunes for her and for the Congress Party, became a turning point in modern Indian politics, and also put Belchhi front and center in the national news. This part of Belchhi is located in Patna District.And that time a new policy passed by Bihar govt. to built a police station and a post office. After some year a Block was built in the centre of village. Belchhi is that village where 14 people were shot dead by gun and then buried in fire by team of mahavir mahto. Now Belchhi becomes a village where people live with love and fortune. A real gentleman name Pramod kumar conduct chaiti Durga Puja and built a Durga Mata Temple beside road no. 431.

Sufi Chillah

The part of Belchi where the famous Sufi chillah is situated is located in Nalanda district (Bihar Sharif).  Nalanda adjoins Patna district, having split off from Patna in 1972.

The 12th century Sufi saint Usman Harooni's chillah (a shrine, but not a burial shrine) is in Belchi. According to legend, Usman had a muridah (a female Sufi student) who resided in Belchi and had promised her that after her death her tomb would be positioned beneath Usman Harooni's legs. Eventually, Usman Harooni died in Makkah, Arabia, and his body was buried there. To fulfill his promise, he came to Belchi in spirit and ordered his chillah to be built, and beside it the tomb of the muridah. Thus, Usman's chillah in Belchi is regarded as a tangible emblem of his spiritual strength.

Since the discovery of the chillah site by a traveling Chishti shaikh in the 15th century A.D., a celebration of Usman Harooni's urs (anniversary of his transitioning out of the world) has been a popular annual event at the Chillah Belchi, from the 14th to the 16th of Shawwal (Islamic calendar).

References

Villages in Patna district
Caste-related violence in Bihar